Getting Away with Murder may refer to:

 Getting Away with Murder (film), a 1996 film starring Jack Lemmon, Lily Tomlin, and Dan Aykroyd
 Getting Away with Murder (1975 film) or End of the Game, a film based on the novella Der Richter und sein Henker by Friedrich Dürrenmatt
 Getting Away with Murder (album), an album by Papa Roach
 "Getting Away with Murder" (song), the title song of the Papa Roach album Getting Away With Murder
 Getting Away with Murder (web series), a comic series on the Independent Film Channel and its website
 Getting Away with Murder (play), a 1996 play co-written by Stephen Sondheim and George Furth
Getting Away with Murder: The True Story of the Emmett Till Case, a 1993 non-fiction book by Chris Crowe
 Twist (stage play), first produced under the title Getting Away with Murder, a 1990 play by Miles Tredinnick